Navipet is a Mandal in Nizamabad district in the state of Telangana in India Navipet is top mandal in Nizamabad district Which has good market value for crops and small revenue business. Navipet lies on Nizamabad Bhainsa main road. 
Navipet is famous for weekly goats market.
  

Navipet is a large village located in Navipet Mandal of Nizamabad district, Telangana with total 1938 families residing. The Navipet village has population of 8563 of which 4230 are males while 4333 are females as per Population Census 2011.

In Navipet village population of children with age 0-6 is 973 which makes up 11.36 % of total population of village. Average Sex Ratio of Navipet village is 1024 which is higher than Telangana state average of 993. Child Sex Ratio for the Navipet as per census is 942, higher than Telangana average of 939.

Navipet village has higher literacy rate compared to Telangana. In 2011, literacy rate of Navipet village was 67.58 % compared to 67.02 % of Andhra Pradesh. In Navipet Male literacy stands at 77.53 % while female literacy rate was 57.96 %.

As per constitution of India and Panchyati Raaj Act, Navipet village is administrated by Sarpanch (Head of Village) who is elected representative of village. ATS Srinivas And Mohammed Abdul Raoof { Shakeel } are Sarpanch for Navipet and newly formed Station Area Gram Panchayat.

UPHC  Urban Primary Health Centre, Jagdishwar Reddy hospital are the 2 major hospitals in Navipet. 

List of all towns and Villages in Navipet Mandal of Nizamabad district, Telangana. Complete details of Population, Religion, Literacy and Sex Ratio in tabular format.

Navipet is also famous for Ayub Hotel & Najeeb Hotel chai. People travelling through Navipet definitely takes chai at both hotels.

Transport

Roadways
Navipet have frequent connectivity to Hyderabad, Nizamabad, Basar and Bhainsa.

Railways
Navipet railway station lies on Secunderabad-Manmad Line. Navipet Railway Station was built by Nizam's Guaranteed State Railways in Around 1903. Navipet have daily passenger trains to Nizamabad Hyderabad and Nanded. Express trains don't have stop
New platform work is under construction from July 2020. 
Passenger trains following Navipet are listed below.

Passengers Trains Passing Through Navipet

Airways
RGIA of Hyderabad (176 km) and Nanded airports are nearest airports to Navipet.
Nizamabad airport has been proposed it will be constructed in Jakranpally mandal

Mosques & Temples 
Navipet have 4 mosques, Jama Masjid Market Area, Makkah Masjid Subash Nagar, Madinah Masjid Railway Station Area, Rahmeniya Masjid Dharyapur. Navipet Have Numerous Temples Like Markandeya Mandir Main Road, Hanuman Temple Dharyapur, Sai Baba Temple Venkateshwara Colony, Ayyappa Temple on Basar Road.

References 

Villages in Nizamabad district